Reginald is a masculine given name in the English language.

Etymology and history
The name is derived from the Latin Reginaldus, which has been influenced by the Latin word regina, meaning "queen". This Latin name is a Latinisation of a Germanic language name. The Germanic name is composed of two elements: the first ragin, meaning "advice", "counsel", "decision"; the second element is wald, meaning "rule", "ruler". The Old German form of the name is Raginald; Old French forms are Reinald and Reynaud.

Forms of this Germanic name were first brought to the British Isles by Scandinavians, in the form of the Old Norse Rögnvaldr. This name was later reinforced by the arrival of the Normans in the 11th century, in the Norman forms Reinald and Reynaud.

The Latin Reginaldus was used as a Latin form of cognate names, such as the Old Norse Rögnvaldr, and the Gaelic Ragnall and Raghnall.

Translations 

 Afrikaans: Ryno
 Ancient Germanic: Raginald, Reinald, Reinhold
 Ancient Scandinavian: Ragnvaldr
 Arabic: ريجنالد (Ryǧināld)
 Belarusian: Рэджынальд (Redžynaĺd)
 Bulgarian: Реджиналд (Redzhinald)
 Catalan: Renald
 Chinese: 雷金纳德 (Léijīnnàdé) (雷金納德)
 Danish: Ragnvald
 Dutch: Reinoud, Reinout
 Finnish: Reino
 Filipino: Regino
 French: Réginald, Renaud, Renoir, Renouard, Reynaud
 German: Reinhold
 Gujarati: રેજિનાલ્ડ (Rējinālḍa)
 Hebrew: רג'ינלד (Rejinald)
 Hindi: रेगीनाल्ड (Rēgīnālḍa)
 Icelandic: Rögnvaldur
 Irish: Raghnall
 Italian: Rinaldo
 Japanese: レジナルド (Rejinarudo)
 Kannada: ರೆಜಿನಾಲ್ಡ್ (Rejinālḍ)
 Korean: 레지날드 (Rejinaldeu)
 Latin: Reginaldus
 Macedonian: Реџиналд (Redžinald)
 Middle Irish: Ragnall
 Mongolian: Режиналд (Ryejinald)
 Norwegian: Ragnvald
 Old French: Reinald, Reynaud
 Old German: Raginald
 Old Irish: Ragnall 
 Old Norse: Rögnvaldr
 Persian: رجینالد
 Polish: Reginald, Romuald
 Portuguese: Reginaldo, Reinaldo, Reynaldo, Ronaldo
 Punjabi: ਰੇਜਿਨਾਲਡ (Rējinālaḍa)
 Russian: Рогволод (Rogvolod)
 Scottish Gaelic: Raghnall
 Serbian: Региналд (Reginald)
 Spanish: Reinaldo, Reynaldo
 Swedish: Ragnvald
 Tamil: ரெஜினால்டு (Rejiṉālṭu)
 Telugu: రెజినాల్డ్ (Rejinālḍ)
 Thai: เรจินัล (Recinạl)
 Ukrainian: Реджинальд (Redzhynalʹd)
 Welsh: Rheinallt
 Yiddish: רעגינאַלד (Reginald)

Use and popularity
Today Reginald is regarded as a very formal name, and bearers generally shorten their name to Reg in ordinary usage. Reggie is a pet form of Reg.

People named Reginald

Middle Ages
Ordered chronologically
 Reginald I, Count of Burgundy (986–1057), second Count of the Free County of Burgundy
 Reginald I, Count of Bar, Count of Bar (1105–1149)
 Reginald de Dunstanville, 1st Earl of Cornwall (c. 1110–1175), also High Sheriff of Devon
 Raynald of Châtillon (c. 1125–1187), also known as Reginald of Châtillon, a knight in the Second Crusade and Prince of Antioch
 Reginald of Sidon (1130s–1202), Count of Sidon and an important noble in the Kingdom of Jerusalem
 Reginald of Canterbury, medieval French writer around 1200
 Reginald (bishop of the Isles) (died c. 1226)
 Reginald de Braose (1182–1228), Norman nobleman
 Raynald of Belleville (died 1241), Hungarian prelate
 Reginald of Piperno (c. 1230–c. 1290), Italian Dominican, theologian and companion of St. Thomas Aquinas
 Reginald of Bar (bishop of Metz) (died 1316)
 Reginald of Burgundy (died 1321), Count of Montbéliard from 1282 to 1321
 Reginald II, Duke of Guelders (c. 1295–1343)

Modern world
 Reginald Arvizu (born 1969), American rock musician
 Reginald Askew (1928–2012), British Anglican priest and academic
 Reginald Bonham, English blind chess player
 Reginald Bosanquet (1932–1984), British television newsreader best known for presenting News At Ten
 Reginald Denny (actor), English stage, film, and television actor
 Reginald Oliver Denny, the truck driver nearly beaten to death during the Los Angeles riots in 1992
 Elton John (born Reginald Kenneth Dwight), English singer
 Reginald Dyer (1864-1927), British-Indian army officer, mostly remembered for ordering the Jallianwala Bagh massacre in 1919.
 Reginald Earnshaw (1927–1941), believed to be the youngest person in the British services to have died in the Second World War
 Reginald Fessenden (1866–1932), inventor who conducted pioneering experiments in radio
 Reggie Fils-Aimé (born 1961), American businessman and former president/COO of Nintendo of America
 Reg Fleming (1936–2009), National Hockey League player
 Rex Harrison (1908–1990), English actor
 Reginald D. Hunter, American comedian, living and working in Britain
 Reggie Jackson (born 1946), former Major League Baseball player, member of the Baseball Hall of Fame
 Reginald Kray (1933–2000), one of the Kray twins, English criminals
 Reg Keys, British anti-war campaigner and parliamentary candidate
 Reginald Lee (1870-1913), lookout stationed in the crow's nest of the RMS Titanic when the ship collided with an iceberg
 Reggie Miller (born 1965), former National Basketball Association player, member of the Basketball Hall of Fame
 Reginald Mitchell (1885-1937), British aeronautical engineer, designer of the Supermarine Spitfire
 Reginald Noble, best known as Redman
 Reginald Owen (1887-1972), British character actor
 Reginald Perera (1915-1977), Sri Lankan Sinhala Trotskyist
 Reginald Pole (1500–1558), English Archbishop of Canterbury and cardinal
 Reginald Sydney Vernon Poulier (1894-1976), Sri Lankan Burgher civil servant
 Reginald Prentice (1923–2001), British politician
 Reginald Punnett (1875–1967), British geneticist
 Reg Saunders (1920–1990), Australian army officer
 Reginald Tennekoon, Sri Lankan Sinhala MP for Minipe
 Reg Varney (1916–2008), English actor, entertainer and comedian
 Reginald VelJohnson (born 1952), American actor
 Reggie White (1961–2004), American football player, member of both the College and Pro Football Halls of Fame
 Reginald Mengi, who was a Tanzanian Billionaire, and chairman of IPP companies
 Reginald (wrestler), professional wrestler and former acrobat
 Reggy Roach 2000-Present Rapper and singer signed to Roach Records under Capitol

Fictional characters
 Reginald, in Saki short stories
 Reginald, nemesis and cousin of Richie Rich in the movie and comic books
 Reginald Barclay, a recurring character in the Star Trek fictional universe
 Reginald Bunthorne, the main character of the Gilbert and Sullivan opera Patience
 Bushroot, Reginald Bushroot, supervillain in the Disney television series Darkwing Duck
 Reginald Deadman, police constable in the British television sitcom Goodnight Sweetheart
 Reggie Mantle, in Archie Comics
 Reginald Perrin, the main character of a series of novels by David Nobbs, and The Fall and Rise of Reginald Perrin, the popular BBC-commissioned 1970s comedy based upon it
 Reginald Jeeves, the personal servant to Bertie Wooster in a series of short stories and novels by P. G. Wodehouse
 Reginald "Reg" Hollis, a long-standing fictional police constable in the British television series The Bill
 Reginald "Bubbles" Cousins, in the American television series The Wire
 Reginald, a fictional koala bear in American Dad!, voiced by Erik Durbin
 Chief Inspector Reginald Wexford, the protagonist in a series of mysteries by Ruth Rendell
 General Reginald Peter Skarr, in Evil Con Carne and The Grim Adventures of Billy and Mandy
 Reginald "Belch" Huggins, a minor antagonist in Stephen King’s 1986 novel It
 Reginald "Red" Forman, in That 70s Show
 Reginald Roach, in the RoboRoach animated TV series
 Chief Superintendent Reginald Bright, in the Endeavour TV series
 Reginald Bane, a recurring character in Mysticons animated TV series
 Captain Reginald Thisleton, a World War I fighter pilot whom Woodhouse is heavily implied to have been lovers with in an episode of Archer
 Reginald "Reggie" Peters, a ghost teenager who forms with two other dead himbos and a living girl a band in Julie and the Phantoms
 Reginald Copperbottom, the leader of the Toppat Clan in the video game series Henry Stickmin

References

English-language masculine given names
English masculine given names